Angel food cake, or angel cake, is a type of sponge cake made with egg whites, flour, and sugar. A whipping agent, such as cream of tartar, is commonly added. It differs from other cakes because it uses no butter. Its aerated texture comes from whipped egg white. Angel food cake originated in the United States and first became popular in the late 19th century. It gained its unique reputation along with its name due to its light and fluffy texture.

Description

Angel food cake requires egg whites whipped until they are stiff. Cream of tartar is added to the mixture to stabilize the egg whites. Remaining ingredients are gently folded into the egg white mixture. 

For this method of leavening to work well, it is useful to have flour that has been made of softer wheat. Cake flour is generally used because of its light texture. The softer wheat and the lack of fat cause angel food cake to have a very light texture and taste.

Angel food cake should be cut with a serrated blade, as a straight-edged blade tends to compress the cake rather than slice it. Forks, electric serrated knives, special tined cutters, or a strong thread should be used instead.

Angel food cake is usually baked in a tube pan, a tall, round pan with a tube up the centre that leaves a hole in the middle of the cake. A bundt pan may also be used, but the fluted sides can make releasing the cake more difficult. The center tube allows the cake batter to rise higher by 'clinging' to all sides of the pan. The angel food cake pan should not be greased, unlike pans used to prepare other cakes. This allows the cake to have a surface upon which to crawl up, helping it to rise.  After baking, the cake pan is inverted while cooling to prevent the cake from falling in on itself. Angel food cake is sometimes frosted but more often has some sort of sauce, such as a sweet fruit sauce, drizzled over it. A simple glaze is also popular.  Recently, many chefs (Alton Brown in particular) have popularized the idea of adding aromatic spices such as mace and cloves to the cake.

History
Angel food cake is a white sponge cake made with only stiffly beaten egg whites (yolks would make it yellow and inhibit the stiffening of the whites) and no butter.  The first recipe in a cookbook for a white sponge cake is in Lettice Bryan's The Kentucky Housewife of 1839.  Since there is no butter in the cake, the angel food cake is not related to the butter cakes: snow-drift cake, silver cake or lady cake.

The Home Messenger Book of Tested Recipes, 2d ed., 1878, by Isabella Stewart contained the first recipe for Angel's Food Cake. Stewart's detailed recipe called for eleven egg whites, sugar, flour, vanilla extract and cream of tartar.

Uses 

The cake is often served with berries and eaten for dessert.

The name, which comes from the texture, which is "so light that angels could eat it and still fly without being weighted down", has given it a special association in some communities.  Among African Americans, the cake is often served at funeral receptions, with the idea that the deceased person is now living in Heaven among the angels.  Among the Pennsylvania Dutch, it is considered a wedding cake, and the couple is said to be blessed by angels.

The most traditional method, also known as the angel food cake method, is as follows. First the egg whites, and possibly salt, vanilla extract, and cream of tartar, are mixed at a medium speed until a soft peak forms. Whipping continues while the sugar is slowly added. Once a hard peak is formed,  the flour is folded into the mixture of egg whites and sugar. This technique is done in order to disturb the foam as little as possible.

Different equipment is used when preparing an angel food cake at home or in a small bakery as opposed to a large scale production. Many recipes found in cookbooks advise bakers to whip the egg whites in a copper bowl. The theory behind this is that the whisk incorporates copper particles or ovotransferrin, which is attached to copper particles, into the egg whites, improving the flexibility and stability of the foam. Some research has found that the copper significantly increases the dilatational elasticity, which is the elasticity of the protein cell wall at the interface of air/water.

A planetary mixer, such as a stand mixer or handheld mixer, is appropriate for a homemade or bakery cake. If the cake is being mass-produced, a continuous mixer is preferred. There are three methods in which the cake can be made at home or in a commercial setting. The first two methods are most commonly used at home or in a small bakery using planetary mixers in various sizes. Large planetary mixers may have a vacuum in order to pressurize the ingredients. This allows for control of the emulsion and temperature.

The first method is the foam process or angel food cake method. The egg whites are whipped until a foam is formed before any other ingredients are added. This method ensures that the foam is not disturbed when it is being formed and that the maximum number of bubbles stay intact. 

Another method is called the meringue process. This entails whipping all or most of the ingredients together at the same time. This may result in a lower quality foam and a final cake with a reduced volume. 

The last method is called the continuous process and is usually used in commercial bakeries because it creates a consistent product in large volumes. Ingredients are fed into the continuous mixer in either one or two stages. A one-stage process mixes all of the ingredients together and feeds them into an emulsion head. Upon entry into the emulsion head, air is incorporated, fully mixing the batter. In a two-stage process, the ingredients are blended separately in different tanks according to the recipe. The speed of the mixer is controlled, as well as air flow to help mix the batter. The final batter may then go through a static mixer (a pipe with a spiral blade inside) to be deposited in a tube pan, depositor, or hopper.

Normally angel food cakes are baked in a straight-sided tube pan, but similar pans such as a bundt pan are acceptable. It is very important that the pan does not have a non-stick surface and that no grease is applied to the sides or around the tube. As the cake bakes, it expands and rises. The sides and hollow center tube act as supports for the foam as it expands. The hollow pan also allows for an even heat distribution.

For the optimal angel food cake outcome, experts  believe that the cake should be baked for at the shortest amount of time at the highest temperature. The temperature and duration depends on the size and weight of the cake. If the angel food cake does not bake long enough, the foam and gel structures will not reach their full potential. In a bakery, angel food cakes could be baked in a rack oven, revolving oven, convention oven, or small deck oven. A commercial bakery may use a tunnel or traveling oven. 

When the cake has finished baking, it should have a golden brown color on the exposed area. The final volume will generally be two to three times larger than the batter volume.

Angel food cakes are cooled upside down. Some tube pans have "feet" or "fingers" that extend off of the top rim of the pan. The "feet" are placed on a cooling rack. If the pan does not have "feet" it is customary for home bakers to place a glass soda bottle or something similar through the tube to ensure that the pan is elevated. The elevation provides sufficient air flow to the cake, so that it cools properly. If a non-stick pan or greased pan were used, the cake would fall out when inverted, leading to a collapsed cake.

Angel food cakes have a shelf-life of a few days at room temperature or up to a week in a refrigerator because of the tendency for moisture to migrate and evaporate. After a few days the cake will be dry and lack flexibility.

Molecular and structural composition

Egg whites 

Egg whites play an integral role in the structure of the baked cake. Egg whites are composed of many proteins; however, only ovalbumin, conalbumin, lysozyme, and globulins  have properties which aid in creating a voluminous angel food cake. Ovalbumin and globulins will produce a foam that is equal to or greater than the size of the egg whites.

Egg white proteins have many uses in baking, one of which is the ability to create and maintain a foam. Whipping incorporates air throughout the egg whites, as well as denaturing or unfolding the proteins to create thinner protein molecules. Overrun, similar to lightness, describes the amount of air pushed into the foam. In terms of an angel food cake, overrun is the increase in volume from the original volume caused by the inclusion of air. The overrun of an egg white foam ranges from 500 to 800%. This means that whipping 100 mL of egg whites would result in 500–800 mL of air incorporated into the foam. During whipping, protein adsorption allows for rapid foam formation. Adsorption is the ability to spontaneously form a very thin layer on a surface. The denatured proteins move to the air/water interface to create the cell walls of the air bubbles. Cell wall formation occurs when the denatured proteins aggregate, forming an extremely thin network or film.  Many interactions between the proteins and the interface are involved, including hydrogen bonding, electrostatic interactions, disulfide bonds, and Van der Waals interactions.  A cake made with egg yolks would not be as light and airy because they have a lower foaming ability than egg whites.

This move, to the air/water interface, by the proteins is also aided by their hydrophobic and hydrophilic part. The hydrophobic moieties orient themselves toward the air while the hydrophilic moieties orient themselves toward the water portion of the interface. The air molecules at the air/water interface interact less with the other molecules that are fully inside the bubble. This lack of interaction causes the air molecules to have excess energy, resulting in surface tension. The presence of egg white proteins at the interface acts as a surfactant which lowers the surface tension and promotes foam development. A foam is a type of emulsion: air in an aqueous solution. If the surface tension was not lowered, the air bubbles would coalescence and the emulsion would separate.

The interfacial dilational modulus (E) describes how the egg white proteins or surfactants covering the air/water interface are able to resist deformation from stretching or compression. An elastic and viscosity component are incorporated into the value, which account for the energy that is lost and recovered as a result of deformation.

E = dγ/d ln A

E: interfacial dilational modulus

γ: change in interfacial tension

A: change in interfacial area at a constant shape

The most stable and voluminous foams are created when the egg white proteins are near their isoelectric points. Protein adsorption is most rapid at the isoelectric point because electrostatic repulsion is reduced for proteins with a neutral net charge. The viscoelasticity of protein foam films is usually at its highest near its isoelectric point. This is why acid is usually added to the cake batter, in order to adjust the pH.

The preparation of the batter should be done as quickly as possible. When the foam sits, disproportionation will occur. This is the result of water draining from the foam and collecting at the bottom. The bubbles at the top of the foam will grow larger as the water leaves and the cell walls or film become too weak and break, forming larger bubbles.

Whipping aids 
Whipping aids improve the foaming properties of albumen, a protein found in egg whites, which means a firmer foam will be established in a shorter amount of time. Cream of tartar is an acidic salt which adjusts the pH of egg whites so the proteins will be more soluble, as well as reducing protein denaturation during whipping. If cream of tartar is not used the cake may not reach its maximum achievable volume. Cream of tartar also decolorizes the flavone pigments in flour, giving a final cake that is a bright white color. The whiteness of the cake is also caused by the way cream of tartar creates very small and uniform air bubbles, which gives the cake the appearance of being whiter after baking.

Flour 
The baking process causes the batter to expand and go from a liquid to a solid foam. During this rise in temperature the air bubbles will either expand, coalesce, or break. An egg white foam will continue to expand uniformly until the internal temperature reaches  – . Based on the ideal gas law, as the temperature increases, the volume of the air bubbles will expand. The temperature will continue to rise, causing the cake to expand at different rates and egg white proteins will gradually denature. This establishes the setting of the foam structure. By the time the temperature reaches , all of the egg white proteins will have set in place.

The foam structure will decrease slightly or collapse in order to form a solid foam of less volume. This occurs while the cake is still baking, not when it is cooling. The combination of protein denaturation and starch gelatinization determines whether the cake will set or collapse. When proteins denature, they are not in a stable state. In order to stabilize, the denatured proteins will aggregate around air bubbles and within the continuous phase of the batter. The aggregation and overlapping of the proteins forms a very stable network.

The flour plays an important role in the texture, structure, and elasticity of an angel food cake. Minimal folding of the flour allows cell walls to form when it comes in contact with the egg protein foam and sugar mixture. If the batter is over-mixed, the egg white proteins may coagulate causing the bubbles to break during baking, or the cell walls may become too rigid, lacking elasticity. This would reduce the volume and result in a coarse texture. However, if the batter is under-mixed, a weak foam will form.

A gluten matrix is formed when the proteins glutenin and gliadin, found in wheat flour, are mixed in the presence of water. When the batter is agitated, these two proteins form cross-links, disulfide bonds, ionic bonds, and hydrogen bonds. The matrix that forms is strong and very flexible. Although no water is added to the batter, the gluten reacts with the water found in egg whites. Since air has already been entrapped in the foam, the flour proteins can only coat the already entrapped air. This helps to strengthen the cell walls and batter during baking or any other handling. This is beneficial because the meringue on its own is weak, cannot expand in heat, and does not have any elasticity normally expected in cakes.

Starch gelatinization occurs around the same time as when expansion stops and the cake sets or collapses. When starch granules are exposed to heat and water, they swell, leaching out some starch and forming hydrogen bonds with other starch granules. About 96% of the starch granules are gelatinized. Starch granules create very strong and rigid gel networks. The starch gel network is interspersed throughout the structure along with the aggregated protein network. The formation of the starch gel may interfere with expanding bubbles, causing them to burst and air to leave the cake. This would result in a collapsed cake.

Sugar 
Sugar functions as a sweetener, stabilizer, and tenderizer. The amount of sugar has a large impact on the overrun and stability of the foam. When sugar and egg whites are whipped together, a meringue is formed. If the amount of sugar is less than or equal to the amount of egg whites, a soft meringue is formed. A stiffer meringue is formed when there is more sugar than egg white. Angel food cakes usually have equal parts sugar and egg white. Sugar will disturb protein foam formation in a positive or negative manner. It is also important that the sugar is added slowly, so that the crystals have a chance to dissolve. It is typically added after a weak foam has been formed. This way it can help stabilize the foam instead of impeding on it, causing coagulation and collapse. When the sugar dissolves, it interacts with the proteins at the air/water interface, creating a thicker and more stable cell wall. The sugar can also assist in the denaturing and aggregation of egg white proteins, which increases overrun, giving a lighter texture. Sugar binds water through hydrogen bonds, which allows for a moist final cake and why all of the moisture does not leave during baking.

Since there is no shortening, butter, fat, or oil, sugar is the only tenderizer. The more sugar added, the more tender the cake will be. However, if too much is added, the cake may collapse because the foam structure is not strong enough to support itself.

When the cake has finished baking, it should have a golden brown color on the exposed area. This is due to Maillard browning reactions. If the cake bakes for too long, more moisture will be removed and the texture will turn out dry, rough, and potentially burnt.

Additional ingredients in commercially produced cakes
Commercial bakeries have a need to reduce cost and increase the shelf life for mass-produced products. For these reasons they use many ingredients that deviate from the traditional angel food cake recipe.

Dehydrated and frozen egg whites are cheaper and more efficient than fresh egg whites. However, each lot of dehydrated egg whites varies from the next. This results in each batch of cakes varying in texture, moisture, volume, and height. Surfactants that have been used to improve the whipping properties of dehydrated eggs are sodium desoxycholate, triethyl citrate, triacetin, sodium oleate and oleic acid. Frozen egg whites do not form as firm or stable foams as fresh egg whites. It may be necessary to adjust the pH if the eggs have been refrigerated for a long time because they become more alkaline than fresh eggs. Acids can be added in manufacturing such as acetic, malic, tartaric, and citric. These improve the color and cake structure by lowering the pH, however they do not work as well as cream of tartar.

Instead of using pure cake flour, wheat flour or a mixture of wheat flour and raw wheat starch is used. The wheat flour is bleached to remove any brown pigments and produce a bright white color. The pH of the bleached flour is between 3 and 4.5, although the optimal pH of starch gelatinization is between 3.7 and 3.9. Acidifiers are used in order to reach this pH range. The optimal flour protein content is between 3% and 4%, and must be below 4.5%. If a mixture is used, at least 20% by weight should be wheat flour. A small amount of raw wheat starch may be added to the sugar as a grinding aid.

Pregelatinized starch may be added to increase the rate of starch gelatinization. One method of pregelatinization starts by heating a mixture of starch and water until a gel forms. The gel may be placed on a heated roll in a thin layer in order to dry it. Once all the water has been removed, a starch cake is left on the roll. The cake is then scraped off and pulverized to form a powder. When the pregelatinized starch powder is subjected to water, a gel forms. The pregelatinized starch increases water adsorption. This in turn increases the batter viscosity and helps retain the entrapped air while the batter is prepared and as it starts to bake. The gel is not as strong has it would be if a normal starch was mixed with water and heated. However, the combination of pregelatinized starch and starch in the wheat flour create an acceptable gel together. Typically corn starch is used, however a variety of other starches also work.

A balanced chemical leavening such sodium bicarbonate, along with an acidifier is another common ingredient. When reacted together, the acidifier has the ability to release all of the carbon dioxide from the sodium bicarbonate. A variety of acidifiers can be used, including potassium bitartrate, tartaric acid, and disodium phosphate. The type of acidifier used depends on when the preferred release of CO2 is. If the release would be most beneficial when the batter is forming, citric acid would be ideal because it is fast acting. The amount of acidifier depends on which agent, such as sodium bicarbonate, is used because they have varying neutralization points.

An excess acidifier is also added; however, it is not used in combination with the sodium bicarbonate. Instead it lowers the batter pH to facilitate the starch gelatinization and maintain the egg white protein foam volume in the baking cake. At a lower pH, the egg white proteins are able to entrap more air during both preparation and baking. The optimal pH for the batter is between 5.5 and 6.8. It also helps to create a whiter cake, which is more desirable to consumers. It is typical that the excess acidifier is the same as that used to react with the balanced chemical leavener.

Adding a small amount of calcium chloride may be used to alter the pH to the optimum value when dehydrated egg whites with a higher pH are used. It may also alter the flour gelatinization temperature. This ensures that when large quantities of cakes are produced, the cakes will be the best possible quality and volume, without a gummy layer forming.

A whipping aid such as modified soy protein can help to account for the decreased foaming ability of dehydrated or frozen egg whites. Modified soy protein is a soy protein in a solution which is then acidified using hydrochloric acid. Pepsin or another enzyme is then added to enhance the protein foaming abilities. Once the enzyme activity has ceased, the solution is heated to deactivate the enzyme and more hydrochloric acid is added if a pH adjustment is required.

Oxidized wheat starch is a tenderizing agent that may be added to give the angel food cake a lighter texture. Raw wheat starch is treated with sodium hypochlorite, neutralized, purified, and dried. The final starch has molecules with shorter chain lengths, which prevents the gel network from being too tough.

Unlike a homemade angel food cake, water may be used when mixing the dry ingredients, as well as to reconstitute dehydrated egg whites.

See also
 A variety of chocolate cake known as Devil's food cake, considered Angel food's "counterpart", is another popular American cake that was developed later. However, unlike angel food cake, devil's food cake is a type of butter cake.
Chiffon cake

References

External links

 History of the cake

American cakes
Sponge cakes